FCH may refer to:

Football clubs 
 F.C. Hansa Rostock, in Germany
 FC Helsingborg, in Sweden
 FC Hessleholm, in Sweden
 FC Hjørring, in Denmark
 FC Homburg, in Germany

Other uses 
 Familial combined hyperlipidemia
 Felipe Calderón Hinojosa (born 1962), President of Mexico 2006–2012
 Forum Club Handball
 Fraser Canyon Hospital, in Hope, British Columbia, Canada
 Fresno Chandler Executive Airport, in California, United States
 The Fuller Center for Housing, an American housing charity
 Fundación Chile (FCh), a Chilean think tank
 Fusion controller hub, an AMD chipset
 Free Capitol Hill, a self-declared autonomous zone